Lac des Bez is a lake at Grande-Rivière in the Jura department of France.

Bez